Jonathan Reguero Segura (born 19 March 1989) is a Spanish footballer who plays as a forward.

Club career
Born in Vitoria-Gasteiz, Basque Country, Reguero finished his graduation with Deportivo Alavés' youth setup, and made his senior debuts with the reserves in the 2007–08 season, in Tercera División. On 24 January 2009 he made his first-team debut, coming on as a second-half substitute in a 0–2 home loss against Albacete Balompié in the Segunda División.

In the 2009 summer Reguero was definitely promoted to the main squad, now in Segunda División B. He subsequently went on to resume his career in the same division but also in the fourth level, representing Bilbao Athletic, SD Leioa (two stints), Club Marino de Luanco and Coruxo FC.

References

External links

1982 births
Living people
Footballers from Vitoria-Gasteiz
Spanish footballers
Association football forwards
Segunda División B players
Tercera División players
Deportivo Alavés B players
Deportivo Alavés players
Bilbao Athletic footballers
Marino de Luanco footballers
Coruxo FC players
SD Leioa players